Italy competed at the 2013 World Aquatics Championships in Barcelona, Spain between 19 July and 4 August 2013.

Medalists

Diving

Italy qualified 11 quota places for the following diving events.

Men

Women

Open water swimming

Italy qualified 10 quota places for the following events in open water swimming.

Men

Women

Mixed

Swimming

Italian swimmers achieved qualifying standards in the following events (up to a maximum of 2 swimmers in each event at the A-standard entry time, and 1 at the B-standard):

Men

Women

Synchronized swimming

Italy has qualified twelve synchronized swimmers.

Water polo

Men's tournament

Team roster

Stefano Tempesti
Amaurys Pérez
Niccolò Gitto
Pietro Figlioli
Alex Giorgetti
Maurizio Felugo
Niccolò Figari
Valentino Gallo
Christian Presciutti
Deni Fiorentini
Matteo Aicardi
Christian Napolitano
Marco Del Lungo

Group play

Round of 16

Quarterfinal

Semifinal

Third place game

Women's tournament

Team roster

Elena Gigli
Francesca Pomeri
Arianna Garibotti
Federica Radicchi
Elisa Queirolo
Rosaria Aiello
Tania Di Mario
Roberta Bianconi
Giulia Enrica Emmolo
Valeria Palmieri
Aleksandra Cotti
Teresa Frassinetti
Loredana Sparano

Group play

Round of 16

References

External links
Barcelona 2013 Official Site
FIN (Federazione Italiana Nuoto) 
Nuoto.it 

Nations at the 2013 World Aquatics Championships
2013 in Italian sport
Italy at the World Aquatics Championships